Forshaga is a locality and the seat of Forshaga Municipality, Värmland County, Sweden, with 6,229 inhabitants in 2010.

Industry 
The municipality has more than 850 small and medium-sized companies across a broad spectrum of industries. A number of them are active in dental technology and in the care and rehabilitation of youths.

Forshaga municipality is the largest employer with about 950 employees. The largest private company in Forshaga is Stora Enso which has about 100 employees. Stora Enso is active in the paper industry and a member of the regional company cluster Paper Province.

Notable natives
 Stefan Holm, high jump Olympic champion in 2004.
 Sten Tolgfors, Swedish Minister for Defence in the Reinfeldt Cabinet (2007–2012)
 Nisse Nilsson, Swedish ice hockey player.
 Vomitory, Swedish brutal death metal band.

References

Populated places in Värmland County
Populated places in Forshaga Municipality
Municipal seats of Värmland County
Swedish municipal seats